Jabez Chickering (died 1826) was a lawyer and businessman from Dedham, Massachusetts.

Personal life
Chickering was the son of the minister in Dedham's South Church, also named Jabez Chickering, and his wife Hannah, the daughter of Thomas Balch.  He was graduated from Harvard College in 1804. He had a wife and six children. Chickering died in Monroe, Michigan in 1826.

Career
Chickering was a lawyer with a large practice and a justice of the peace.

Along with William Phillips, Chickering was a principal incorporation of the Dedham Worsted Company on Mother Brook. It went out of business after only three years, however, and the mill was purchased by Benjamin Bussey. He published the Dedham Gazette, with Theron Metcalf as editor.

In September 1821 he applied to become a Unitarian minister, saying he had "faithfully & regularly attended to the studies of the Theology School at Cambridge. A professor, Andrews Norton, however, protested that his "certificate was not regularly voted" and that Chickering "has been far from faithfully attending to my exercises."

In January 1824, the public became aware that Chickering had gone bankrupt and went to New York to try and recoup some of his money. On February 2, the directors and shareholders of the Dedham Bank, where Chickering was a cashier, were informed that $35,000 was also missing. His widow was eventually able to pay off the bank and other individuals to whom Chickering owed money.

Dispute at First Church

When Rev. Jason Haven died, Chickering was appointed to the committee to find his replacement in the pulpit at the First Church and Parish in Dedham. Bates was unpopular with the congregation, and it was hoped that the new minister's politics would be more in line with the community. On March 1, 1818, just days after Bates left town, Chickering and the committee produced Alvan Lamson. Lamson was an 1817 graduate of Harvard Divinity School, a Unitarian stronghold. The congregation were largely conservative Calvinists.

Those who opposed Lamson did not raise any objections to his moral or professional qualifications. They did, however, object to his theology and found him lacking in "spirituality and knowledge of the scriptures" and displayed little of "that which fixes the attention and reaches the heart." Lamson's initial reaction seems to have been to decline the call, given the size of the opposition, but he was persuaded to accept by Chickering. Many members of the church stormed out when they heard he had accepted.

A council was called to consider the situation and then to ordain Lamson. Chickering presented at the council letters showing that if all the members of the church had been present when the vote was taken that there would have been a majority in favor of Lamson. The council was not inclined to consider the views and membership status of the absent members and instead considered Lamson's qualifications.

The congregation was split, with the conservative church members leaving and taking the church's property with them. They also sent a committee, led by Chickering, to meet with Samuel Fales as the senior deacon. They demanded "Christian satisfaction" regarding his deaconship. When they reported back to the liberal sect, they charged Fales with leasing the parsonage house out without the church's consent. Fales was also accused of not giving direct answers to their questions, including which group he considered to be the true church. As a result, the liberal group voted to remove Fales as deacon but allowed him to remain a member of the church.

A lawsuit, Baker v. Fales, ensued, with the liberal members of the church attempting to regain possession of the church's property. At the trial in February 1820, the members of First Church were represented by Judge John Davis and Chickering while the breakaway church members were represented by Theron Metcalf, Samuel Haven, and a Mr. Prescott. Judge Samuel Wilde presided over the trial and the jury eventually ruled for Chickering's side.

The case was appealed to the Supreme Judicial Court and was heard during the October 1820 session. There, Massachusett's Solicitor General, Daniel Davis, represented the plaintiffs with Chickering. The breakaway defendants had Daniel Webster and Theron Metcalf representing them. Chickering's side won once again at the high court. The case was a major milestone in the road towards the separation of church and state and led to the Commonwealth formally disestablishing the Congregational Church in 1833.

In a pamphlet Haven published, Chickering was portrayed as one of the central "plotters" in the whole ordeal. Chickering then attempted to sue Haven for libel, but a grand jury in Norfolk County refused to indict Haven in October 1820. Chickering then tried in Cambridge, where the pamphlet was printed, and a Middlesex Grand Jury did indict him. Haven was arrested on December 1, 1819. Due in part to the long speech Haven gave in his own defense, the trial lasted over two days. Haven was acquitted.

Notes

References

Works cited

 

Year of birth uncertain
1826 deaths
Lawyers from Dedham, Massachusetts
Businesspeople from Dedham, Massachusetts
Harvard College alumni
American bank robbers